Club Life is a 1987 American action thriller drama film directed by Norman Thaddeus Vane and starring Tom Parsekian, Michael Parks, Jamie Barrett, Tony Curtis and Dee Wallace.

Cast
Tom Parsekian as Cal
Michael Parks as Tank
Jamie Barrett as Sissy
Tony Curtis as Hector
Dee Wallace as Tilly
Ron Kuhlman as The Doctor
Pat Ast as Butch
Bruce Reed as First Punk
Kristine DeBell as Fern

Release
The film was released theatrically in New York City on April 3, 1987.

Reception
Kevin Thomas of the Los Angeles Times gave the film a positive review and wrote that it “manages to bring freshness and warmth to the oft-told tale of youthful innocents adrift in Bad Old Hollywood.”

Janet Maslin of The New York Times gave the film a negative review and wrote, “The film is too loud and busy to establish this in terms of character or conversation, so it concentrates strictly on the visual set, which is garish but attention-getting. The acting consists mostly of unfocused posturing, in a succession of scenes that could easily have been rearranged without losing any of their dramatic focus. Only Mr. Curtis is any better than the material, with a world-weary gravity that seems, in this context, like the last word in maturity.”

References

External links
 

1987 films
1987 action thriller films
American action thriller films
1980s English-language films
1980s American films